Kurt Walter Leucht (8 June 1913, in Ellefeld, Vogtland – 1998) was a German architect and city planner. He is mostly known for his design of the planned city Eisenhüttenstadt.

External links
  Todesjahr in archINFORM.net

1913 births
1998 deaths
20th-century German architects
Date of death missing
Place of death missing